Adrián Eloys Leites López (born 8 February 1992) is a Uruguayan footballer who plays as a midfielder for Primera División club Cerrito.

References

External links
 

Living people
1992 births
Uruguayan footballers
Association football midfielders
C.A. Cerro players
Villa Teresa players
Rampla Juniors players
Deportes Melipilla footballers
Cobán Imperial players
Club Atlético River Plate (Montevideo) players
Uruguayan Primera División players
Uruguayan Segunda División players
Primera B de Chile players
Liga Nacional de Fútbol de Guatemala players
Uruguayan expatriate footballers
Uruguayan expatriate sportspeople in Chile
Uruguayan expatriate sportspeople in Guatemala
Expatriate footballers in Chile
Expatriate footballers in Guatemala
Footballers from Montevideo